Parkerfield is a city in Cowley County, Kansas, United States.  As of the 2020 census, the population of the city was 406.  It is an eastern suburb of Arkansas City.

History
Parkerfield was incorporated as a city of the third class on March 16, 2004, and elections for mayor and city council were held March 30.  The decision to incorporate the city grew out of a protest by area residents of neighboring Arkansas City's plan to annex the area.  They believed the city codes to be too restrictive and the taxes too high.  The residents hired an attorney to fight the annexation.  The petition for incorporation was filed with the Cowley County Clerk on January 20, 2004, and was approved by the Board of County Commissioners on March 9.

Geography
Parkerfield is located at (37.085036,-96.998978), near the east edge of Arkansas City.  The land topography consists of about 564 acres (261 acres platted and  unplatted at the time of incorporation) with basically a flat terrain with no natural boundaries and a drainage pattern generally to the southeast for the southern half of the area and to the northwest for the northern half of the area.

Demographics

The city was incorporated on March 16, 2004, thus its first census was the 2010 census.

2010 census
As of the census of 2010, there were 426 people, 156 households, and 125 families residing in the city. The racial makeup of the city was 95.5% White, 0.2% African American, 1.2% Native American, 1.6% Asian, 0.7% from other races, and 0.7% from two or more races. Hispanic or Latino of any race were 1.9% of the population.

There were 156 households, of which 32.7% had children under the age of 18 living with them, 71.8% were married couples living together, 3.8% had a female householder with no husband present, 4.5% had a male householder with no wife present, and 19.9% were non-families. 16.0% of all households were made up of individuals, and 7.7% had someone living alone who was 65 years of age or older. The average household size was 2.73 and the average family size was 2.99.

The median age in the city was 47.1 years. 25.8% of residents were under the age of 18; 5.2% were between the ages of 18 and 24; 15% were from 25 to 44; 35.5% were from 45 to 64; and 18.5% were 65 years of age or older. The gender makeup of the city was 50.7% male and 49.3% female.

Government
Parkerfield is incorporated as a city of the third class and, as such, receives services from Creswell Township and Cowley County.  Governmental services are provided through the acquisition of water from a rural water district, private sewage systems, fire protection from a rural fire district, law enforcement from the Cowley County Sheriff's Department, and road maintenance by the township and the county.  The city is run by an elected mayor and five-member city council, and an appointed city clerk and city treasurer—all unpaid positions.

Education
The community is served by Arkansas City USD 470 public school district.

References

Further reading

External links
 City of Parkerfield
 Parkerfield - Directory of Public Officials
 Parkerfield city map, KDOT

Cities in Kansas
Cities in Cowley County, Kansas
2004 establishments in Kansas